The New York Titans are a professional lacrosse team based in New York, New York, that plays in the National Lacrosse League (NLL). The 2007 season was the Titans inaugural season. The franchise was announced by the NLL on July 11, 2006, and the name "Titans" was chosen in September 2006.

The Titans suffered through a rough inaugural season. After two losses, they won their first game at home against their expansion cousins, the Chicago Shamrox, but then lost the next six straight games. They did finish strong, however, winning two of their last three games, but finished well out of the playoffs.

Regular season

Conference standings

Game log
Reference:

Player stats
Reference:

Runners (Top 10)

Note: GP = Games played; G = Goals; A = Assists; Pts = Points; LB = Loose balls; PIM = Penalty minutes

Goaltenders
Note: GP = Games played; MIN = Minutes; W = Wins; L = Losses; GA = Goals against; Sv% = Save percentage; GAA = Goals against average

Awards

Transactions

Trades

Roster
Reference:

See also
2007 NLL season

References

New York